Lina Khoury (Arabic لينا خوري), born April 27, 1976, is a Lebanese theatre director, writer, producer, and educator. She is known for tackling taboo subjects and raising controversial questions in her plays.

Early life

Khoury was born in Trieste, Italy in 1976 from a Lebanese father and a Syrian mother from Assyrian ancestry. Khoury grew up in an era defined by Lebanon’s civil war. In 1997 Khoury graduated from the Lebanese American University (LAU), with a B.A. degree in Communication Arts. After working as an actress and assistant director in few television shows and plays as well as hosting two radio shows, Khoury moved to the United States, where she pursued her graduate studies and earned her M.F.A in Theatre Directing from the University of Arkansas (UOA) in 2002.

Career
Since Khoury moved back to Beirut in 2003, she has taught, given workshops and master classes in Acting, Script Writing and Directing for theatre, Film and Television in various institutions in Beirut, mainly LAU, ALBA, AUST and The Lebanese University. Khoury’s main work and passion is in theatre. She chooses to work on controversial topics that reflect the society’s mal functions as she sees it, daring to question inherited beliefs and norms with wit and style. Khoury’s influence is felt throughout Lebanese contemporary theatre  through her adoption of ground breaking view points, and management of talents as Gabriel Yammine, Roula Hmade, Talal El Jourdi, Diamand Bou Aboud, Patricia Namour, Elie Mitri, Nada Abou Farhat, Tarek Tamim and the renowned Ziad Al Rahbani.

In 2004 Khoury started working on her first play, Haki Niswan; which premiered in the spring of 2006. It was inspired by Eve Ensler’s Vagina Monologues and was a pioneer play that tackled taboo subjects in the Lebanese society and the Arab World, mainly those of women's issues and sexual freedom. Haki Niswan took the Lebanese theatrical scene by storm and played for two years (from 2006 till 2008) to full house audiences. Khoury’s fame rose instantly, as the play had raving reviews from local, national, and international media.

In 2009, Khoury wrote, directed and produced Sar Lazem Nihki, a human comedy about relationships between men and women. Majnoun Yehki, was the third major play that Khoury directed and produced; it premiered in 2013. Based on Tom Stoppard’s EGBDF, it was a musical black comedy which ironically questioned the oppression of regimes and the humanity of individuals. The play featured Ziad Al Rahbani, whom Khoury brought back to the theatre 20 years after his last play.

In 2016 Khoury put Issam Mahfouz’s controversial play Limatha... on stage. Khoury chose to stage this social political tragi-comedy to shed light on the situation of acceptance and numbness of the Lebanese society. In 2018, Khoury wrote, (with the help of writers Fouad Yammine and Rami El Tawil), directed and produced Haki Rjel an Avant-garde Black Comedy, which is a sequel to her hit play Haki Niswan. The play delved into the hidden world of men and related for the first time in Lebanon and the Mena region stories of oppressed men, in a society that is well trenched in masculinity and where women are oppressed and face discrimination on multiple levels

In television, Khoury presented two entertainment shows: El Layle Layltak On LBCI and Men El Ekhir on MTV Lebanon. She also worked as a producer for El Layle Layltak, as well as Hiya wa Houwa and The Investor with MBC in Dubai. Lina was one of the Acting coaches in Arab Casting on Abu Dhabi TV and MTV Lebanon. She also directed and produced corporate videos and video clips in her early days. In film, Khoury was one of the producers for the film Taxi El Balad. She also participates as a jury member in theatre festivals and short film competitions.

Independently, Khoury works on various projects as a writer, artistic consultant, acting coach, and drama translator.

Theatre plays

Gallery

References

External links
 facebook
 Instagram

1976 births
Living people